The American Pacing Classic is a defunct three-race series in harness racing for Standardbred pacers aged three and older. It was run annually between 1955 and 1981 at three different racetracks with the final hosted by Hollywood Park Racetrack in Inglewood, California. During the same period, these tracks also offered the corresponding American Trotting Classic.

The American Pacing Classic replaced the Golden West Pace which had been run from 1946 through 1954 under the auspices of the Western Harness Racing Association with races at both Santa Anita Park and Hollywood Park.

Historical race events
In the inaugural American Pacing Classic series, Hillsota, Diamond Hal and Times Square each won a heat of the Pacing Classic in the identical time of 1:59 flat. As a result, Hillsota and Times Square were awarded a tie for the series based on their final standing in a summary of the three heats.

Los Alamitos Race Course created a short-lived one mile race they called the American Pacing Classic which was run from 1990 to 1992.

Records
 Most wins by a driver
 4 – Joe O'Brien (1959, 1963, 1975, 1979)

 Most wins by a trainer
 3 – Stanley Dancer (1965, 1971, 1972)

 Stakes record
 2:07 3/5 – Niatross (1981) at 1 1/8 miles
 1:55 3/5 – Adios Butler (1960) at 1 mile

Winners of the American Pacing Classic

References

Santa Anita Park
Hollywood Park Racetrack
Harness races in the United States
Sports in Los Angeles